Karl Richard Kehr (born June 18, 1959) is a former American football guard in the National Football League for the Washington Redskins.  He played college football at Carthage College.

1959 births
Living people
People from Phoenixville, Pennsylvania
American football offensive guards
Players of American football from Pennsylvania
Green Bay Packers players
Washington Redskins players
Carthage Firebirds football players